The Acantilados Grand Prix or Gran Premio Los Acantilados was a golf tournament on the PGA of Argentina Tour, formerly the principal professional golf tour in Argentina. Founded in 1954, it was always been held at the Club de Golf Los Acantilados in Mar del Plata, Buenos Aires Province. It was last held in 2006.

Winners

* – won following playoff

External links
Profesionales de Golf de Argentina – official site

Golf tournaments in Argentina
Recurring sporting events established in 1954
Recurring sporting events disestablished in 2006
1954 establishments in Argentina
2006 disestablishments in Argentina